The 1925 Brisbane City Council election was held on 21 February to elect the Lord Mayor and councillors for each of the 20 wards of the City of Brisbane. The election was the first for the City of Brisbane, which had been created from the amalgamation of 20 local governments the previous year.

Results

References 

1925
1925 elections in Australia
1920s in Brisbane
February 1925 events